Shuizhai is a town under the jurisdiction of Wuhua County, Meizhou City, Guangdong Province, southern China.

References

See also 
List of township-level divisions of Guangdong

Towns in Guangdong
Wuhua County